The 2009–10 Los Angeles Clippers season was the 40th season of the franchise in the National Basketball Association (NBA).

The season saw the team draft Blake Griffin, but during a preseason game, he went down with a knee injury and was unable to play in what could have been his rookie season.

Key dates
 June 25 – The 2009 NBA draft took place in New York City.
 July 8 – The free agency period started.

Summary

NBA Draft 2009

Draft picks

Free agency

Roster

Roster Notes
 Power forward Blake Griffin missed the entire season due to a left knee injury.
 Guard Kareem Rush becomes the 15th former Laker to play with the crosstown rival Clippers.

Pre-season

Regular season

Standings

Record vs. opponents

Game log

|- bgcolor="#ffcccc"
| 1
| October 27
| @ L. A. Lakers
| 
| Eric Gordon (21)
| Chris Kaman (16)
| Baron Davis (8)
| Staples Center18,997
| 0–1
|- bgcolor="#ffcccc"
| 2
| October 28
| Phoenix
| 
| Marcus Camby (23)
| Marcus Camby (11)
| Baron Davis (12)
| Staples Center15,974
| 0–2
|- bgcolor="#ffcccc"
| 3
| October 30
| @ Utah
| 
| Eric Gordon (22)
| Marcus Camby (13)
| Baron Davis (4)
| EnergySolutions Arena19,911
| 0–3
|- bgcolor="#ffcccc"
| 4
| October 31
| Dallas
| 
| Chris Kaman (27)
| Chris Kaman (11)
| Baron Davis (6)
| Staples Center13,626
| 0–4

|- bgcolor="#ccffcc"
| 5
| November 2
| Minnesota
| 
| Chris Kaman (25)
| Marcus Camby (15)
| Baron Davis (8)
| Staples Center13,614
| 1–4
|- bgcolor="#ccffcc"
| 6
| November 6
| @ Golden State
| 
| Eric Gordon, Baron Davis (25)
| Marcus Camby (12)
| Baron Davis (7)
| Oracle Arena18,788
| 2–4
|- bgcolor="#ccffcc"
| 7
| November 7
| Memphis
| 
| Chris Kaman (26)
| Chris Kaman (9)
| Eric Gordon (6)
| Staples Center15,399
| 3–4
|- bgcolor="#ffcccc"
| 8
| November 9
| New Orleans
| 
| Chris Kaman, Rasual Butler, Ricky Davis (14)
| Marcus Camby (11)
| Baron Davis (8)
| Staples Center14,760
| 3–5
|- bgcolor="#ffcccc"
| 9
| November 11
| Oklahoma City
| 
| Chris Kaman (20)
| Chris Kaman (11)
| Baron Davis (9)
| Staples Center14,248
| 3–6
|- bgcolor="#ffcccc"
| 10
| November 13
| Toronto
| 
| Chris Kaman (25)
| Chris Kaman, Craig Smith (7)
| Baron Davis (7)
| Staples Center15,615
| 3–7
|- bgcolor="#ccffcc"
| 11
| November 15
| @ Oklahoma City
| 
| Chris Kaman (25)
| Marcus Camby (9)
| Baron Davis (6)
| Oklahoma City Arena17,715
| 4–7
|- bgcolor="#ffcccc"
| 12
| November 17
| @ New Orleans
| 
| Al Thornton (30)
| Marcus Camby (14)
| Baron Davis (9)
| New Orleans Arena13,116
| 4–8
|- bgcolor="#ffcccc"
| 13
| November 18
| @ Memphis
| 
| Baron Davis (23)
| Al Thornton, DeAndre Jordan (7)
| Sebastian Telfair, Baron Davis (5)
| FedEx Forum10,012
| 4–9
|- bgcolor="#ccffcc"
| 14
| November 20
| Denver
| 
| Rasual Butler (27)
| Chris Kaman (7)
| Baron Davis (9)
| STAPLES Center18,155
| 5–9
|- bgcolor="#ccffcc"
| 15
| November 23
| Minnesota
| 
| Al Thornton (31)
| Marcus Camby (18)
| Baron Davis (6)
| STAPLES Center13,815
| 6–9
|- bgcolor="#ffcccc"
| 16
| November 25
| @ Indiana
| 
| Baron Davis (25)
| Marcus Camby (21)
| Marcus Camby (3)
| Conseco Fieldhouse12,356
| 6–10
|- bgcolor="#ccffcc"
| 17
| November 27
| @ Detroit
| 
| Chris Kaman (26)
| Marcus Camby (9)
| Baron Davis (10)
| The Palace of Auburn Hills18,954
| 7–10
|- bgcolor="#ccffcc"
| 18
| November 29
| Memphis
| 
| Eric Gordon (29)
| Marcus Camby (14)
| Baron Davis (6)
| Staples Center14,854
| 8–10

|- bgcolor="#ffcccc"
| 19
| December 2
| Houston
| 
| Baron Davis (20)
| Marcus Camby (19)
| Baron Davis (6)
| Staples Center13,836
| 8–11
|- bgcolor="#ccffcc"
| 20
| December 5
| Indiana
| 
| Al Thornton (19)
| Marcus Camby (17)
| Marcus Camby (6)
| Staples Center15,305
| 9–11
|- bgcolor="#ffcccc"
| 21
| December 8
| Orlando
| 
| Eric Gordon (21)
| Marcus Camby (13)
| Baron Davis (11)
| Staples Center16,750
| 9–12
|- bgcolor="#ffcccc"
| 22
| December 13
| San Antonio
| 
| Baron Davis (20)
| Chris Kaman (10)
| Baron Davis (6)
| Staples Center16,464
| 9–13
|- bgcolor="#ccffcc"
| 23
| December 14
| Washington
| 
| Eric Gordon (29)
| Marcus Camby (15)
| Baron Davis (12)
| Staples Center14,511
| 10–13
|- bgcolor="#ccffcc"
| 24
| December 16
| @ Minnesota
| 
| Eric Gordon (25)
| Marcus Camby (18)
| Baron Davis (13)
| Target Center12,526
| 11–13
|- bgcolor="#ffcccc"
| 25
| December 18
| @ New York
| 
| Chris Kaman (20)
| Marcus Camby (13)
| Baron Davis (4)
| Madison Square Garden19,763
| 11–14
|- bgcolor="#ccffcc"
| 26
| December 19
| @ Philadelphia
| 
| Chris Kaman (24)
| Marcus Camby (22)
| Baron Davis (13)
| Wachovia Center13,752
| 12–14
|- bgcolor="#ffcccc"
| 27
| December 21
| @ San Antonio
| 
| Chris Kaman (23)
| Chris Kaman (15)
| Baron Davis, Sebastian Telfair (6)
| AT&T Center17,451
| 12–15
|- bgcolor="#ffcccc"
| 28
| December 22
| @ Houston
| 
| Chris Kaman (29)
| Marcus Camby (19)
| Baron Davis (9)
| Toyota Center17,128
| 12–16
|- bgcolor="#ffcccc"
| 29
| December 25
| @ Phoenix
| 
| Rasual Butler (22)
| Chris Kaman (10)
| Baron Davis (8)
| US Airways Center16,709
| 12–17
|- bgcolor="#ccffcc"
| 30
| December 27
| Boston
| 
| Chris Kaman (27)
| Chris Kaman (12)
| Baron Davis (13)
| Staples Center19,060
| 13–17
|- bgcolor="#ffcccc"
| 31
| December 30
| @ Portland
| 
| Chris Kaman (25)
| Marcus Camby (11)
| Baron Davis (11)
| Rose Garden Arena20,505
| 13–18
|- bgcolor="#ccffcc"
| 32
| December 31
| Philadelphia
| 
| Chris Kaman (26)
| Chris Kaman, Marcus Camby (10)
| Baron Davis (7)
| Staples Center15,257
| 14–18

|- bgcolor="#ccffcc"
| 33
| January 4
| Portland
| 
| Chris Kaman (20)
| Marcus Camby (15)
| Baron Davis (9)
| Staples Center15,104
| 15–18
|- bgcolor="#ccffcc"
| 34
| January 6
| L. A. Lakers
| 
| Baron Davis (25)
| Marcus Camby (14)
| Baron Davis (10)
| Staples Center19,388
| 16–18
|- bgcolor="#ccffcc"
| 35
| January 10
| Miami
| 
| Chris Kaman (22)
| Marcus Camby (17)
| Baron Davis (14)
| Staples Center19,060
| 17–18
|- bgcolor="#ffcccc"
| 36
| January 12
| @ Memphis
| 
| Baron Davis (27)
| Baron Davis (12)
| Baron Davis (12)
| FedEx Forum11,004
| 17–19
|- bgcolor="#ffcccc"
| 37
| January 13
| @ New Orleans
| 
| Baron Davis (19)
| Marcus Camby (20)
| Baron Davis (6)
| New Orleans Arena14,348
| 17–20
|- bgcolor="#ffcccc"
| 38
| January 15
| @ Lakers
| 
| Craig Smith, Eric Gordon (17)
| Marcus Camby (11)
| Sebastian Telfair (11)
| Staples Center18,997
| 17–21
|- bgcolor="#ffcccc"
| 39
| January 16
| Cleveland
| 
| Rasual Butler (33)
| Marcus Camby (9)
| Baron Davis (8)
| Staples Center19,277
| 17–22
|- bgcolor="#ccffcc"
| 40
| January 18
| New Jersey
| 
| Chris Kaman (22)
| Marcus Camby (14)
| Baron Davis, Sebastian Telfair (9)
| Staples Center14,533
| 18–22
|- bgcolor="#ccffcc"
| 41
| January 20
| Chicago
| 
| Baron Davis (23)
| Marcus Camby (25)
| Baron Davis, Ricky Davis (6)
| Staples Center16,794
| 19–22
|- bgcolor="#ffcccc"
| 42
| January 21
| @ Denver
| 
| Craig Smith (21)
| Craig Smith, Marcus Camby (6)
| Baron Davis (9)
| Pepsi Center15,343
| 19–23
|- bgcolor="#ccffcc"
| 43
| January 24
| @ Washington
| 
| Chris Kaman (20)
| Marcus Camby (19)
| Baron Davis (11)
| Verizon Center12,356
| 20–23
|- bgcolor="#ffcccc"
| 44
| January 25
| @ Boston
| 
| Rasual Butler (17)
| Marcus Camby (14)
| Baron Davis (7)
| TD Garden18,624
| 20–24
|- bgcolor="#ffcccc"
| 45
| January 27
| New Jersey
| 
| Chris Kaman (24)
| Chris Kaman (11)
| Bobby Brown (5)
| Izod Center9,220
| 20–25
|- bgcolor="#ffcccc"
| 46
| January 29
| @ Minnesota
| 
| Baron Davis (28)
| Marcus Camby (20)
| Marcus Camby, Baron Davis (5)
| Target Center13,398
| 20–26
|- bgcolor="#ffcccc"
| 47
| January 31
| @ Cleveland
| 
| Baron Davis (30)
| DeAndre Jordan (13)
| Baron Davis (7)
| Quicken Loans Arena20,562
| 20–27

|- bgcolor="#ccffcc"
| 48
| February 2
| @ Chicago
| 
| Eric Gordon (24)
| Chris Kaman (11)
| Baron Davis (7)
| United Center19,335
| 21–27
|- bgcolor="#ffcccc"
| 49
| February 3
| @ Atlanta
| 
| Chris Kaman, Eric Gordon (17)
| Marcus Camby (20)
| Marcus Camby, Baron Davis (6)
| Philips Arena13,303
| 21–28
|- bgcolor="#ffcccc"
| 50
| February 6
| San Antonio
| 
| Chris Kaman (21)
| Marcus Camby (12)
| Baron Davis (9)
| Staples Center18,258
| 21–29
|- bgcolor="#ffcccc"
| 51
| February 9
| Utah
| 
| Chris Kaman (19)
| Marcus Camby (15)
| Baron Davis (9)
| Staples Center15,467
| 21–30
|- bgcolor="#ffcccc"
| 52
| February 10
| @ Golden State
| 
| Al Thornton (18)
| DeAndre Jordan, Marcus Camby (8)
| Baron Davis (7)
| Oracle Arena17,230
| 21–31
|- bgcolor="#ffcccc"
| 53
| February 16
| @ Portland
| 
| Eric Gordon (20)
| DeAndre Jordan (11)
| Bobby Brown (5)
| Rose Garden Arena20,265
| 21–32
|- bgcolor="#ffcccc"
| 54
| February 17
| Atlanta
| 
| Chris Kaman (21)
| Chris Kaman (10)
| Steve Blake (9)
| Staples Center15,485
| 21–33
|- bgcolor="#ccffcc"
| 55
| February 20
| Sacramento
| 
| Eric Gordon (30)
| Chris Kaman (16)
| Steve Blake (12)
| Staples Center17,903
| 22–33
|- bgcolor="#ccffcc"
| 56
| February 22
| Charlotte
| 
| Rasual Butler (20)
| Chris Kaman (13)
| Baron Davis (10)
| Staples Center15,892
| 23–33
|- bgcolor="#ccffcc"
| 57
| February 24
| Detroit
| 
| Chris Kaman (21)
| Chris Kaman (15)
| Baron Davis (7)
| Staples Center16,095
| 24–33
|- bgcolor="#ffcccc"
| 58
| February 26
| @ Phoenix
| 
| Eric Gordon (25)
| Drew Gooden (9)
| Steve Blake (9)
| US Airways Center18,043
| 24–34
|- bgcolor="#ffcccc"
| 59
| February 28
| @ Sacramento
| 
| Chris Kaman (18)
| Chris Kaman (11)
| Baron Davis (8)
| Power Balance Pavilion13,071
| 24–35

|- bgcolor="#ccffcc"
| 60
| March 1
| Utah
| 
| Eric Gordon (24)
| Chris Kaman (14)
| Baron Davis (12)
| Staples Center15,422
| 25–35
|- bgcolor="#ffcccc"
| 61
| March 3
| Phoenix
| 
| Chris Kaman (24)
| Chris Kaman (9)
| Baron Davis (11)
| Staples Center17,455
| 25–36
|- bgcolor="#ffcccc"
| 62
| March 5
| Oklahoma City
| 
| Chris Kaman, Craig Smith (19)
| Chris Kaman (15)
| Baron Davis (6)
| Staples Center18,497
| 25–37
|- bgcolor="#ffcccc"
| 63
| March 6
| @ Utah
| 
| Drew Gooden (20)
| Chris Kaman (13)
| Baron Davis (8)
| EnergySolutions Arena19,911
| 25–38
|- bgcolor="#ffcccc"
| 64
| March 9
| @ Orlando
| 
| Baron Davis (16)
| Drew Gooden (14)
| Baron Davis (9)
| Amway Arena17,461
| 25–39
|- bgcolor="#ffcccc"
| 65
| March 10
| @ Miami
| 
| Rasual Butler (31)
| Drew Gooden (9)
| Baron Davis (9)
| AmericanAirlines Arena14,785
| 25–40
|- bgcolor="#ffcccc"
| 66
| March 12
| @ Charlotte
| 
| Baron Davis (24)
| Chris Kaman (11)
| Steve Blake (9)
| Time Warner Cable Arena15,835
| 25–41
|- bgcolor="#ffcccc"
| 67
| March 13
| @ San Antonio
| 
| Baron Davis (24)
| Chris Kaman (11)
| Steve Blake (9)
| AT&T Center18,581
| 25–42
|- bgcolor="#ffcccc"
| 68
| March 15
| New Orleans
| 
| Rasual Butler (19)
| DeAndre Jordan (11)
| Baron Davis (17)
| Staples Center15,617
| 25–43
|- bgcolor="#ccffcc"
| 69
| March 17
| Milwaukee
| 
| Chris Kaman (20)
| Drew Gooden (11)
| Steve Blake (8)
| Staples Center15,241
| 26–43
|- bgcolor="#ffcccc"
| 70
| March 21
| Sacramento
| 
| Eric Gordon (23)
| Chris Kaman (9)
| Steve Blake (6)
| Staples Center17,233
| 26–44
|- bgcolor="#ffcccc"
| 71
| March 23
| @ Dallas
| 
| Drew Gooden (26)
| Drew Gooden (20)
| Baron Davis (13)
| American Airlines Center19,705
| 26–45
|- bgcolor="#ccffcc"
| 72
| March 25
| @ Houston
| 
| Craig Smith (25)
| Drew Gooden (14)
| Baron Davis (8)
| Toyota Center15,201
| 27–45
|- bgcolor="#ffcccc"
| 73
| March 28
| Golden State
| 
| Rasual Butler (21)
| Chris Kaman (13)
| Baron Davis (7)
| Staples Center17,868
| 27–46
|- bgcolor="#ffcccc"
| 74
| March 30
| @ Milwaukee
| 
| Drew Gooden (20)
| DeAndre Jordan (13)
| Eric Gordon, Steve Blake (6)
| Bradley Center14,321
| 27–47
|- bgcolor="#ffcccc"
| 75
| March 31
| @ Toronto
| 
| Chris Kaman (22)
| Chris Kaman (13)
| Steve Blake (12)
| Air Canada Centre16,106
| 27–48

|- bgcolor="#ffcccc"
| 76
| April 3
| @ Denver
| 
| Eric Gordon (23)
| Chris Kaman (11)
| Steve Blake (8)
| Pepsi Center19,155
| 27–49
|- bgcolor="#ffcccc"
| 77
| April 4
| New York
| 
| Baron Davis (23)
| Chris Kaman (16)
| Baron Davis (11)
| Staples Center16,083
| 27–50
|- bgcolor="#ffcccc"
| 78
| April 7
| Portland
| 
| Rasual Butler, Chris Kaman, Steve Blake (14)
| DeAndre Jordan (11)
| Baron Davis (8)
| Staples Center16,790
| 27–51
|- bgcolor="#ffcccc"
| 79
| April 8
| @ Sacramento
| 
| Chris Kaman (23)
| DeAndre Jordan (10)
| Baron Davis (10)
| Power Balance Pavilion11,418
| 27–52
|- bgcolor="#ccffcc"
| 80
| April 10
| Golden State
| 
| Chris Kaman (27)
| DeAndre Jordan (15)
| Steve Blake (9)
| Staples Center17,476
| 28–52
|- bgcolor="#ffcccc"
| 81
| April 12
| Dallas
| 
| Chris Kaman (17)
| DeAndre Jordan (13)
| Steve Blake (13)
| Staples Center17,838
| 28–53
|- bgcolor="#ccffcc"
| 82
| April 14
| Lakers
| 
| Steve Blake (23)
| Steve Blake, Travis Outlaw (10)
| Steve Blake (11)
| Staples Center20,044
| 29–53

Player statistics

Regular season 

|-
| 
| 29 || 10 || 26.3 || .443 || style=";"| .437 || .750 || 2.4 || 6.1 || .7 || .1 || 6.8
|-
| 
| 23 || 0 || 8.3 || .329 || .281 || .714 || .9 || 1.8 || .3 || .0 || 3.0
|-
| 
| style=";"| 82 || 64 || 33.0 || .409 || .336 || .841 || 2.9 || 1.4 || .4 || .8 || 11.9
|-
| 
| 51 || 51 || 31.3 || .446 || .333 || .659 || style=";"| 12.1 || 3.0 || 1.4 || style=";"| 1.9 || 7.7
|-
| 
| 43 || 0 || 10.9 || .367 || .235 || .619 || 1.2 || 1.0 || .5 || .0 || 2.6
|-
| 
| 1 || 0 || 0.0 || . || . || . || .0 || .0 || .0 || .0 || .0
|-
| 
| 75 || 73 || 33.6 || .406 || .277 || .821 || 3.5 || style=";"| 8.0 || style=";"| 1.7 || .6 || 15.3
|-
| 
| 36 || 2 || 13.9 || .434 || .381 || .581 || 1.6 || 1.1 || .3 || .1 || 4.4
|-
| 
| 24 || 22 || 30.2 || .492 || .000 || style=";"| .921 || 9.4 || .9 || .6 || .3 || 14.8
|-
| 
| 62 || 60 || style=";"| 36.0 || .449 || .371 || .742 || 2.6 || 3.0 || 1.1 || .2 || 16.9
|-
| 
| 70 || 12 || 16.2 || style=";"| .605 || .000 || .375 || 5.0 || .3 || .2 || .9 || 4.8
|-
| 
| 76 || style=";"| 76 || 34.3 || .490 || .000 || .749 || 9.3 || 1.6 || .5 || 1.2 || style=";"| 18.5
|-
| 
| 54 || 0 || 6.7 || .389 || .310 || .778 || .6 || .1 || .1 || .0 || 2.1
|-
| 
| 23 || 6 || 21.7 || .400 || .378 || .800 || 3.6 || 1.1 || .5 || .4 || 8.7
|-
| 
| 7 || 0 || 8.3 || .364 || .333 || . || .9 || .6 || .3 || .4 || 1.3
|-
| 
| 16 || 1 || 7.7 || .400 || . || .750 || 1.7 || .0 || .2 || .3 || 1.6
|-
| 
| 75 || 2 || 16.4 || .569 || .200 || .635 || 3.8 || 1.1 || .4 || .3 || 7.8
|-
| 
| 39 || 1 || 14.9 || .404 || .234 || .774 || 1.1 || 2.9 || .6 || .1 || 4.3
|-
| 
| 51 || 30 || 27.5 || .478 || .357 || .741 || 3.8 || 1.2 || .5 || .4 || 10.7
|}

Awards, records and milestones

Awards

Week/Month

All-Star
 Chris Kaman selected as a reserve center for the Western Conference All-Stars.  Kaman was chosen as a replacement for the injured Brandon Roy on the roster.

Season

Records

Milestones

Injuries and surgeries

Transactions

Trades

Free agents

Re-signed

Additions

Subtractions

References

External links
 2009–10 Los Angeles Clippers season at ESPN
 2009–10 Los Angeles Clippers season at Basketball Reference

Los Angeles Clippers seasons
Los Angeles Clippers